Khair-un-Nissa Jaffery (7 August 1947 - 4 March 1998) was a short story writer, critic and educationist from Hyderabad, Sindh, Pakistan. She served as Professor and Chairperson of the Department of Psychology of Sindh University, Jamshoro, Pakistan.

Biography 
Khair-un-Nissa Jaffery was born on 7 August 1947 at Tando Wali Muhammad, Hyderabad, Sindh, Pakistan. Her parents were from Talhar, Badin District. Her father Ahmed Ali Khuwaja was a professor of Islamic Culture and her mother Sheeren was a house wife. She studied at Miran School and then Zubaida College Hyderabad. She got Master's degree in Psychology from University of Sindh. She started her career as a lecturer of Psychology at University of Sindh in 1970. She retired as a Professor and Chairperson of the same department.

She had an interest in literature and writing since childhood. Her first story "Berozgari Aeen Bandooq" (Joblessness and Gun) was published in the literary magazine Sojhro. She was 27 years old when this story was published. Her first book of short stories titled "Takhleeqa Jo Maut" (Death of Creation) was published in 1978.

In Sindhi Literature, she is known as a bold writer, but at the same time, she was a very simple, clean-hearted and sympathetic woman. She was a noble story writer. She was open-minded and talkative. Her stories depict a reflection of women's psychological, mental, emotional and internal feelings.  She has described woman's oppression, weakness, and compulsion very boldly.

Her story "Havelia khan Hostel Taeen" (Sindhi: حويليءَ کان هاسٽل تائين) goes from the minimalist atmosphere of the mansion to the open space of the hostel. This story became so popular that it was translated into Hindi, Urdu, Chinese and Malayalam languages. Her other notable stories include "Peera Jo Parlau" (Sindhi: پيڙا جو پڙلاءُ) (Echo of Pain),  "Kahro Brand Aeen Kahro Cigarette" (Which Brand and Which Cigarette),  "Qurbatoon Aeen Fasila" (Nearness and Distances), "Tutal Sochoon" (Broken Thoughts) and "Municipality Aeen Kuta" (Municipality and Dogs) etc.

A compilation of all Jafri's works, 'My Creative Journey' was published in 1992 by the Sindhica Academy Karachi, which includes stories, speeches, interviews and her travel to India.  Noted writer Tanveer Junejo has also written a book titled  "Khair-un-Nissa Jaffery - Shakhsiat aeen Fun" on her personality and writings.

References 

1947 births
1998 deaths
Pakistani female writers
Pakistani women writers
Sindhi people
Sindhi female writers
Sindhi-language writers
Writers from Sindh
People from Hyderabad, Sindh